Choi See-Joong (born 4 August 1937) is a South Korean politician who is the former chief of the Korea Communications Commission. He is notable for supporting controversial decisions in the South Korean telecommunication scene. He resigned on 27 January 2012, due to his involvement in bribery.

Criticism
Choi See-Joong has been criticized for defending the Lee Myung-bak government by supporting the SPO's active investigations against "anti-GNP" rumors in the social network services, akin to the Minerva incident.
He was criticized for supporting "a huge emphasis on advertisements for the Chojoongdong TV stations".
The SPO investigated Kim Hak-in (김학인), the chairman of the board Korea Broadcasting Art School, for giving bribes to Choi See-Joong in order to guarantee a director position of Educational Broadcasting System for Kim. There is a further allegation that the closest associate of Choi See-Joong, Jung Yong-uk (정용욱), has obtained a huge amount of bribes and moved to Canada.

See also
Lee Myung-bak

References

External links
  Naver Profile

1937 births
Lee Myung-bak Government
Living people
People from North Gyeongsang Province
South Korean journalists